Mr. Big, released in the middle of his Reprise Records period, was another compilation of Little Richard's mid-1960s recordings for Vee Jay Records, released on the UK Joy label. None of the tracks had previously been released on an album - many had been released on singles in 1965, the rest were previously unreleased . A later album with not only the same name, but also the same cover was released for the US market in 1974 with different tracks. (See The Alternate Mr. Big).
Another similar release came in the form of Talkin‘ ‘bout Soul, also in 1974, with one previously unreleased track and stereo versions of released single sides.

History
As covered on the entry for Little Richard Is Back (And There's A Whole Lotta Shakin' Goin' On!), Richard recorded nearly fifty tracks for the Vee-Jay Records label in 1964/1965. With the collapse of the record label, some of these tracks went unreleased until the 1970s.

The Alternate Mr. Big
Three years after the release of this album, an album for the U.S. market was released using the same name, but with different tracks. The second Mr. Big album utilised the same cover, though is not included in the chronology as it contained nothing previously unreleased. The track listing on the US Mr. Big was as follows:

 "Send Me Some Lovin'"
 "Hound Dog"
 "Whole Lotta Shakin' Goin' On"
 "The Girl Can't Help It"
 "Crossover"
 "It Ain't What Ya Do"
 "Everytime I Think About You"
 "Dancin' All Around the World"
 "Going Home Tomorrow"
 "Money Honey"
 "Ooh My Soul"

Track listing
"Jenny, Jenny" (Enotris Johnson, Richard Penniman) (1:58)
"Without Love (There Is Nothing)" (Danny Small) (3:19)
"Cross Over" (Alvin Tyler) (2:40)
"My Wheel's Been Slippin' All the Way" (Richard Penniman) (2:26)
"It Ain't What You Do (It's the Way How You Do It)" (Anthony Codrington, Richard Penniman) (2:24)
"Every Time I Think About You" (Richard Penniman) (2:12)
"Talkin' 'Bout Soul" (J.W. Alexander) (2:10)
"I Don't Know What You Got (But It's Got Me) - Part 1" (Don Covay) (4:07)
"I Don't Know What You Got (But It's Got Me) - Part 2" (Harmony version) (Don Covay) (2.23)
"Dance What You Wanna" (J.W. Alexander, Sam Cooke, Clifton White) (2:23)
"Dancing All Around the World" (Richard Penniman) (2:57)

Personnel, tracks 1,3-5
Little Richard – vocals, piano
 Maurice James (Jimi Hendrix) - guitar

Rest of personnel unlisted in Vee Jay archives

Personnel, tracks 2,7 and 9
Little Richard – vocals, piano
Clyde Johnson - saxophone
William Green - saxophone
Buddy Collette - saxophone
Earl Palmer - drums
 Maurice James (Jimi Hendrix) - guitar cut 9
 Billy Preston - organ cut 9
 Ronny Miller - bass cut 9
 Bernard Purdie - drums cut 9
 Don Covay - harmony vocal cut 9

Rest of personnel unlisted in Vee Jay archives

Personnel, tracks 6, 8 and 10
Little Richard – vocals, piano
Jimi Hendrix - guitar
Don Covay - harmony vocal
Bernard Purdie - drums
Ronny Miller - bass
Billy Preston - organ

Rest of personnel unlisted in Vee Jay archive.
Above names relate to "I Don't Know What You've Got", "Dancin' All Around The World" and "You'd Better Stop".
“Every time I Think About You” is aka “Something Moves In My Heart”

References

1971 albums
Little Richard albums